Baoule's mouse (Mus baoulei) is a species of rodent in the family Muridae.
It is found in Benin, Ivory Coast, Guinea, possibly Ghana, and possibly Sierra Leone.
Its natural habitat is dry savanna.

References

Mus (rodent)
Mammals described in 1980
Taxonomy articles created by Polbot